Grant Hauschild is an American politician representing District 3 in the Minnesota Senate since 2023.

Education 
Hauschild earned a Bachelor of Arts degree in political science and public administration from the University of North Dakota and a Master of Science in public policy analysis from George Washington University.

Career 
Hauschild worked for Barack Obama's 2012 presidential campaign. From 2011 to 2014, he served in the United States Department of Agriculture as an economic development specialist and confidential assistant. In 2014 and 2015, he served in the office of U.S. Senator Heidi Heitkamp. Hauschild was an unsuccessful candidate for the North Dakota Senate in 2016. He returned to the University of North Dakota in 2015, working as associate director of development until 2017 and director of development from 2017 to 2018. Hauschild moved to Minnesota in 2019 to work for the Essentia Health Foundation. He also served as a member of the Hermantown, Minnesota, city council. Hauschild was elected to the Minnesota Senate in 2022.

References 

Living people
Minnesota Democrats
University of North Dakota alumni
George Washington University alumni
People from Hermantown, Minnesota
Obama administration personnel
United States Department of Agriculture officials
Year of birth missing (living people)